Architecture of Turkey or Turkish architecture in the Republican Period is the architecture practised in Turkey since the foundation of the republic in 1923. In the first years of the republic, Turkish architecture was influenced by Seljuk and Ottoman architecture, in particular during the First National Architectural Movement (also called the Turkish Neoclassical architecture movement). However, starting from the 1930s, architectural styles began to differ from traditional architecture, also as a result of an increasing number of foreign architects being invited to work in the country, mostly from Germany and Austria. The Second World War was a period of isolation, during which the Second National Architectural Movement emerged. Similar to Fascist architecture, the movement aimed to create a modern but nationalistic architecture.

From the 1950s the nation became more internationally connected, which enabled Turkish architects to experiment with new styles and become increasingly inspired by their counterparts in the rest of the world. However, they were largely constrained by the lack of technological infrastructure or insufficient financial resources until the 1980s. Thereafter, the liberalization of the economy and the shift towards export-led growth paved the way for the private sector to become the leading influence on architecture in Turkey.

1920s to early 1930s: First national architectural movement

The First National Architectural Movement (Turkish: Birinci Ulusal Mimarlık Akımı) was an architectural movement led by Turkish architects Vedat Tek (1873–1942) and Mimar Kemaleddin Bey (1870–1927). Followers of the movement wanted to create a new and "national" architecture, which was based on motifs from Seljuk and Ottoman architecture. The movement was also labelled Turkish Neoclassical architecture, or the National Architectural Renaissance. Other prominent followers of this movement were Arif Hikmet Koyunoğlu (1888–1982) and Giulio Mongeri (1873–1953). Notable buildings from this era are the Istanbul Main Post Office (1905–1909), Tayyare Apartments (1919–1922), Istanbul 4th Vakıf Han (1911–1926), State Art and Sculpture Museum (1927–1930), Ethnography Museum of Ankara (1925–1928), Bebek Mosque, and Kamer Hatun Mosque.

1930s to 1950s: Modernism and foreign influence

The Bauhaus style Florya Atatürk Marine Mansion (1935) and the Art Deco style Ankara Central Station (1937) are among the notable examples of this era. As there were not enough architects in Turkey until the 1950s, various architects were invited by the government from Germany, Austria, Switzerland and France, in order to manage the rapid construction of the new capital Ankara. About 40 architects and urban planners designed and oversaw various projects (mostly in Ankara, and to a lesser extent in Istanbul and Izmir) between 1924 and 1942. Among them were Gudrun Baudisch, Rudolf Belling, Paul Bonatz, Ernst Arnold Egli, Martin Elsaesser, Anton Hanak, Franz Hillinger, Clemens Holzmeister, Henri Prost, Paolo Vietti-Violi, Werner Issel, Hermann Jansen, Theodor Jost, Heinrich Krippel, Carl Christoph Lörcher, Robert Oerley, Bernhard Pfau, Bruno Taut and Josef Thorak.

Selected examples of buildings from this era are the Bauhaus style Florya Atatürk Marine Mansion (1935) designed by Seyfi Arkan; the Art Deco style Ankara railway station (1937) designed by Şekip Akalın; the Court of Cassation building (1933–35) designed by Clemens Holzmeister; the Faculty of Languages, History and Geography building (1937) of Ankara University designed by Bruno Taut; and the Grand National Assembly of Turkey building (1938–63) designed by Clemens Holzmeister.

Second national architectural movement

The Stripped Classicism movement of the late 1930s and early 1940s in Europe and North America sought a modern interpretation of Neoclassical architecture. The movement had a particularly notable impact on Fascist architecture in Italy and Nazi architecture in Germany, which aimed to develop the modern versions of the architecture of the Roman (Italy) and Holy Roman (Germany) empires, according to their ideologies. In the same period, there was a trend towards creating a new national architecture in Turkey, which was called the Second National Architectural Movement (Turkish: İkinci Ulusal Mimarlık Akımı). The foreign architects employed in Turkey in this period (especially from Germany and Austria) played an important role in the introduction of this architectural movement and its style. The pioneers of the movement in Turkey were Sedad Hakkı Eldem, Ekrem Hakkı Ayverdi and Emin Halid Onat. To lead this movement, Professor Sedad Hakkı Eldem held National Architecture seminars at  Mimar Sinan Fine Arts University, focusing on traditional Turkish house styles.

Like their contemporary equivalents in Europe and North America, the government buildings of this style in Ankara and Istanbul typically had large proportions (high ceilings, high windows, etc.) to give the impression of a strong state authority. Some of them also had monumental facade designs reminiscent of Neoclassical architecture; but with more modern and plain rectangular shapes, symmetry, simplicity, and a general lack of ornateness.

Some of the buildings in this style are the Ankara Opera House, designed by Şevki Balmumcu (1933–34) and renovated by Paul Bonatz (1946–47); the TCDD General Headquarters Building designed by Bedri Uçar in 1938; Istanbul University Faculty of Science and Faculty of Literature buildings (1944–52); Anıtkabir (1944–53); Istanbul Radio Headquarters (1945–49); Şişli Mosque (1945–49); and the Çanakkale Martyrs' Memorial (1954–60). The movement was particularly influential between 1935 and 1950. From the 1950s, the influence of this style diminished due to the next wave, especially International Style and Rationalism.

1950s and more Western influence

At the beginning of the 1950s, a new generation of architects such as Nevzat Erol, Turgut Cansever, Abdurrahman Hancı, Cengiz Bektaş, Hayati Tabanlıoğlu, Enver Tokay, İlhan Tayman and Yılmaz Sanlı became more influential in the architectural arena. These were architects who either studied in Europe or had information of the modernist architecture of the time. Their quest for modernist architecture was in line with the International Style and Rationalism. However, the development of the Turkish economy was an important factor as well. Even though Turkish architects were able to follow up on the modern design of important architects of the time, they were constrained by the lack of technological infrastructure or insufficient financial resources.

Selected examples of buildings from this era are the Anadolu Club Hotel (1951–1957) in Büyükada designed by Turgut Cansever and Abdurrahman Hancı; Hilton Istanbul Bosphorus (1952–1955) designed by Skidmore, Owings & Merrill and Sedad Hakkı Eldem; Istanbul Municipality Headquarters (1953–1960) designed by Nevzat Erol; Emek Business Center (1959–1965) in Ankara designed by Enver Tokay and İlhan Tayman; and Tekel Headquarters (1958–1960) in Istanbul designed by Yılmaz Sanlı and İlhan Tayman.

One of the most important developments of this period was the establishment of the Chamber of Architects of Turkey in 1954. Various professional organizations for architects had existed beforehand, but there were no laws for the architectural profession until 1954. Brutalist architecture become popular during 1950s, the work of Behruz Çinici in Middle East Technical University is the best example of this era.

1960s and 1970s
Following the 1960 coup d'état, Turkey endured various kinds of political and economic crises which affected the construction industry as well as the architectural sector. Despite these hardships, architects were able to design some important buildings. Abandoning Rationalism, Turkish architects tried to design their buildings in more flexible and fragmented forms. Important works from this period are the Vakıflar Hotel in Istanbul (1968, today the Ceylan Intercontinental Hotel), Middle East Technical University Campuses (1961) in Ankara, Istanbul Manufacturers' Market (1959), Turkish Historical Society Building (1967), Grand Ankara Hotel (1960, today the Rixos Grand Ankara Hotel) and Atatürk Cultural Center (1969) in Istanbul.

As a result of economic and social turbulence, architecture in Turkey suffered also in the 1970s. There were no significant breakthroughs during this period. Some important designs from the 1970s are the Turkish Language Association Building (1972), Atatürk Library (1973) and Abdi İpekçi Arena (1979).

1980s and 1990s
In January 1980, the government of Prime Minister Süleyman Demirel began implementing a far-reaching reform program designed by then Undersecretary of the Prime Ministry Turgut Özal to shift Turkey's economy toward export-led growth. These reforms had a positive effect on the construction industry and architecture. New methods such as prefabrication and curtain wall systems were introduced to Turkish architects and contractors in the 1980s. In addition, steel, aluminum, plastic and glass production increased, which allowed architects to free themselves from rigid forms.

Until the 1980s, the government sector was the leading client when it came to architecture and construction. However, the liberalization of the economy paved the way for the private sector to become the leading influence. Notable architects from this period include Behruz Çinici, Merih Karaaslan, Sevinç Hadi, Şandor Hadi, Ersen Gürsel, Mehmet Çubuk, Doğan Tekeli, Sami Sisa, Emre Arolat, Murat Tabanlıoğlu, Melkan Tabanlıoğlu, Hüsrev Tayla, Doğan Hasol, Atilla Yücel, Sema Soygeniş, Murat Soygeniş and Kaya Arıkoğlu, among others.

21st century
When architects and structural engineers collaborate they can design buildings which are more sustainable.

Earthquakes 
In earthquake-prone areas, all buildings built to 20th century standards may be dangerous, but shortly after the 1999 İzmit earthquake, which killed over 17 thousand people, a new seismic code was brought into force to protect against earthquakes in Turkey. Also following that earthquake a so-called earthquake tax was raised during the government of Bülent Ecevit. Initially thought as a temporary tax, it became permanent. The aim of the tax is to prepare for earthquake related damage. In 2007 the seismic code was strengthened. However, it is alleged that builders often ignored the rules due to corruption. After the 2011 Van earthquakes Prime Minister Recep Tayyip Erdoğan said: "Municipalities, constructors and supervisors should now see that their negligence amounts to murder." In 2018, a zoning law gave amnesties to some unlicensed buildings and some with unlicensed floors.

Further resilience over the 2007 code was mandated in the 2018 Turkish Seismic Code, which took effect on 1st January 2019. Improvements included design supervision and site specific hazard definitions, and for new buildings in vulnerable regions required rebar in high quality concrete. Beams and columns in those buildings must be in the right place to properly absorb shaking. The code is said by foreign experts to be very modern and similar to US codes. However, these 21st century building codes were not very well enforced.

In a bid to shore up support going into the 2018 Turkish presidential election, the government offered amnesties for violations of the building code, allowing non-compliance to continue with the payment of a fee. This poor enforcement of seismic codes was a contributing factor to the devastation of the 2023 Turkey–Syria earthquakes in which over 42,000 people died in Turkey. There were high incidences of support column failure leading to pancake collapses, which complicated rescue efforts. Experts lamented the practice would turn cities into graveyards. The 2023 Turkey–Syria earthquake collapsed many older buildings and some recent ones: the Environment and Urbanization Ministry is assessing the damage. 

Unreinforced masonry buildings are vulnerable. Many older buildings in Istanbul are vulnerable to pancake collapses. Retrofitting old buildings is possible but expensive. Although over 3 million housing units nationwide were strengthened in the 2 decades before 2023, as of that year many apartment blocks do not meet 21st century standards. Building with wood has been suggested.

Climate change

See also

Architecture of Istanbul
Seljuk architecture
Ottoman architecture
List of Turkish architects
List of tallest buildings in Turkey

Notes

References

Further reading
 Sibel Bozdoğan and Esra Akcan, "Turkey: modern architectures in history", Reaktion Books, 2012.

External links

"Turkish Architecture in the Republican Period" (English)
"Cumhuriyet dönemi mimarlığından bir panorama" (Turkish)